Groß Quenstedt is a municipality in the district of Harz, in Saxony-Anhalt, Germany.

References

Municipalities in Saxony-Anhalt